The Resurrection Tomb Mystery is a television documentary program produced and first broadcast on the Discovery Channel and Vision TV in Canada on Thursday, April 12 at 10pm e/p during Easter week 2012. The documentary was executive produced by Simcha Jacobovici, Ric Esther Bienstock and Felix Golubev of Associated Producers, Ltd.

The documentary was preceded by a companion book authored by James Tabor, Professor and Chair of the Department of Religious Studies at the University of North Carolina, Charlotte, and Jacobovici entitled, The Jesus Discovery. The documentary and book claimed to have revealed the earliest evidence of resurrection of Jesus ever discovered.

See also
 The Lost Tomb of Jesus

References

External links 
 The Jesus Discovery Website
 The ASOR Blog
 Associated Producers, Ltd.
 The Jesus Discovery book at Simon and Schuster Website
 Jesus Family Tomb website

American documentary television films
Canadian documentary television films
Discovery Channel original programming
VisionTV original programming
Films directed by Simcha Jacobovici